Ljubiša Stojanović (25 June 1952 – 31 July 2011), better known by his stage name Louis, was a Serbian singer. He was known for his unique musical style and was in the music business from 1970 until his death.

Biography
Born in Leskovac, Louis graduated from the music high school in Niš. He got his B.A. in Music from the Faculty of Music in Belgrade, majoring in voice and composing with arrangement and folklore.

His stage name Louis originated from when he was nine and successfully performed Louis Armstrong's songs. He was among the first to combine jazz with Serbia's folklore. In 1982, he recorded his first record titled Ne kuni me, ne ruži me, majko (Do Not Curse me ,Do Not Scold Me, Mother), gaining high sales. Together with the Serbian band Flamingosi, he almost won the Beovizija 2006 festival for the Eurovision Song Contest 2006 in Athens, Greece.

At the beginning of 2011, he recorded for the Dutch record label Snail Records the album "The Last King Of Balkans" but just before the release of the album, Louis died in a car accident on 31 July 2011, on the road between Feketić and Vrbas. His last show was on 22 July 2011 at Club Jez in Sarajevo.

Discography
1982: Ne kuni me, ne ruži me, majko
1984: Dudi, s puno ljubavi
1985: Srcem i dušom
1986: My way I
1987: My way II
1988: Kamerav
1989: Hajde da se pomirimo
1990: Dunjo moja
1999: Louis (uživo)
2000: Louis (leptir)
2000: The Best of Louis
2001: Pogled iznutra
2005: Čarobnjak
2008: Ciganski san
2011: The Last King of Balkans [2011 Snail Records]

References

External links
 
Biography at Snail Records

1952 births
2011 deaths
Musicians from Leskovac
20th-century Serbian male singers
Serbian folk singers
Road incident deaths in Serbia
Serbian jazz singers
Male jazz musicians
21st-century Serbian male singers
Yugoslav male singers
Beovizija contestants
Beovizija winners